Angelina County is a county located in the U.S. state of Texas. It is in East Texas and its county seat is Lufkin.

As of the 2020 census, the population was 86,395. The Lufkin, TX Micropolitan Statistical Area includes all of Angelina County.

It was formed in 1846 from Nacogdoches County. It is named for a Hasinai Native American woman who assisted early Spanish missionaries and was named Angelina by them.

History
The county's first Anglo settlers were what John Nova Lomax described as "Scotch-Irish backwoods folk." Cotton farmers and slaves did not come to Angelina County because it had poor soil. Lomax added that "Culturally, the county was less moonlight-and-magnolias Dixie than a little pocket of Appalachia, where pioneers, often from similarly hardscrabble areas of Georgia, Alabama and Mississippi, wanted nothing more than to carve homesteads out of the Piney Woods and river thickets, farm a little, maybe raise a scraggly herd of tough cattle to drive to market in New Orleans." Lomax added that "[t]hey also wanted to brew up a little whiskey and subsist on the bass, catfish and perch they hauled from the Neches and Angelina rivers and whatever they could trap and shoot on dry land."

Settlement was still thin when Texas won its independence. Angelina County was organized on April 22, 1846, when Nacogdoches County was divided. The first permanent settler after the county was formed is thought to have been George W. Collins. The population increased quickly thereafter due to the good farming land and to the rivers, which made steamboat transportation possible. The population reached 1,165, of whom 196 were slaves, in 1850. The first county seat was Marion; successively, Jonesville became county seat in 1854, Homer in 1858, and Lufkin in 1892. Lufkin was favored by the route of the Houston, East and West Texas Railway (now the Southern Pacific), which had been built in 1882 from Houston to Shreveport.

Angelina County was settled predominantly by natives of the southern United States, some of them slaveowners who established plantations in their new Texas home. Large plantations were owned by the Stearns, Oates, Kalty, Stovall, and Ewing families. However, many Angelina County farmers were relatively poor men who owned no slaves. In 1847 slaves numbered 154, out of a total population of 834. In 1859 the number of slaves had grown to 427, valued at $269,550, and the total population was 4,271. Cotton culture, however, occupied only 2,048 acres of county land in 1858, a relatively small area for East Texas. Between 1850 and 1860 improved land in the county increased from about 3,000 to about 16,000 acres.

In 1861 Angelina County was the only county in East Texas, and one of only a handful of other Texas counties, to reject secession. This election result was startling when compared with that of Angelina County's neighbor to the immediate south, Tyler County, which supported secession by a 99 percent vote. Angelina County had also given the Constitutional Union party candidate, John Bell, a strong minority vote in the 1860 election. Two companies of county men were organized to fight in the Civil War, but they saw only limited action; only nineteen Angelina County men lost their lives in the war, and no Union soldiers entered the county before 1866.

Geography

Adjacent counties

 Nacogdoches County (north)
 San Augustine County (northeast)
 Jasper County (southeast)
 Tyler County (south)
 Polk County (southwest)
 Trinity County (west)
 Houston County (west)
 Cherokee County (northwest)

National protected area
 Angelina National Forest (part)

Demographics

As of the census of 2000, there were 80,130 people, 28,685 households, and 21,255 families residing in the county.  The population density was 100 people per square mile (39/km2).  There were 32,435 housing units at an average density of 40 per square mile (16/km2).  The racial makeup of the county was 75.10% White, 14.72% Black or African American, 0.30% Native American, 0.67% Asian, 0.02% Pacific Islander, 7.77% from other races, and 1.42% from two or more races.  14.35% of the population were Hispanic or Latino of any race.

There were 28,685 households, out of which 36.10% had children under the age of 18 living with them, 57.80% were married couples living together, 12.30% had a female householder with no husband present, and 25.90% were non-families. 22.80% of all households were made up of individuals, and 9.80% had someone living alone who was 65 years of age or older.  The average household size was 2.70 and the average family size was 3.18.

In the county, the population was spread out, with 27.70% under the age of 18, 9.70% from 18 to 24, 28.60% from 25 to 44, 21.50% from 45 to 64, and 12.60% who were 65 years of age or older.  The median age was 34 years. For every 100 females there were 96.40 males.  For every 100 females age 18 and over, there were 93.70 males.

The median income for a household in the county was $33,806, and the median income for a family was $39,505. Males had a median income of $30,373 versus $20,221 for females. The per capita income for the county was $15,876.  About 12.40% of families and 15.80% of the population were below the poverty line, including 21.90% of those under age 18 and 12.30% of those age 65 or over.

Government and infrastructure
The Angelina County Sheriff's Office is the county law enforcement agency. The Sheriff is Greg Sanches.

Angelina County is governed by its Commissioners Court of which Don Lymbery presides over as County Judge 

It is a "partly-wet" county, with beer and wine generally authorized for off-premises consumption. However, the small community of Burke voted to restrict alcohol sales only to restaurants holding permits.

County Government

Politics

John Nova Lomax of the Houston Press said that the residents of Angelina County "were, and are, a self-sufficient breed, good with their hands, bluntly honest and leery of all central authority." (In 1861, Angelina County voted against seceding from the United States, the only East Texas county to do so.) He also said "[t]heir electoral peculiarity continued through the 20th Century." Angelina County was the seat of power of Charlie Wilson, a politician labeled the "Liberal from Lufkin".

The current state representative from Angelina County is Republican Trent Ashby, first elected in 2012.

Crime
In previous eras criminals established moonshine stands. Around the 1970s some criminals established marijuana farms.  the main drug dealing activity is the methamphetamine trade. Allen Hill, formerly of the Angelina County Narcotics Squad, said that the local meth trade is doing more damage to the county than drug couriers passing through the county, crack cocaine, and heroin. According to Hill, many Hispanic drug dealers increasingly sold imported "ice"-style meth made by drug cartels instead of crack cocaine or powdered cocaine, because they make more money than they did selling crack. Hill said that many of the drug dealers claim to be affiliated with Mexican drug cartels or gangs like MS-13.

Education

Primary/Secondary Education

The following school districts serve Angelina County (districts marked with (*) are located partly within the county and partly outside it):
 Central Independent School District
 Colmesneil Independent School District (*)
 Diboll Independent School District
 Hudson Independent School District
 Huntington Independent School District
 Lufkin Independent School District
 Wells Independent School District (*)
 Zavalla Independent School District

Colleges and Universities
Angelina College, a community college, serves all of Angelina County.

Stephen F. Austin State University is located in Nacogdoches, which is located in neighboring Nacogdoches County.

Transportation

Major highways
  U.S. Highway 59
  Interstate 69 is currently under construction and will follow the current route of U.S. 59 in most places.
  U.S. Highway 69
  State Highway 7
  State Highway 63
  State Highway 94
  State Highway 103
  State Highway 147
  Farm to Market Road 1818

US 59 goes through Angelina County.  It is planned to be upgraded to interstate standards as part of the planned Interstate 69.

Bus
Greyhound Lines operates the Lufkin Station at the Kerrville Bus Company station in Lufkin.

Airport

Angelina County Airport is located seven miles southwest of Lufkin.

Communities

Cities

 Burke
 Diboll
 Hudson
 Huntington
 Lufkin (county seat and largest municipality)
 Zavalla

Census-designated place
 Redland

Unincorporated communities
 Bald Hill
 Central
 Clawson
 Herty
 Homer
 Moffett
 Pollok

Ghost towns

 Alco
 Beulah
 Boynton
 Concord
 Dunagan
 Durant
 Ewing
 Granville
 Manning
 Monterey
 Nancy
 Ora
 Peavy
 Platt
 Rocky Springs
 Shawnee

Gallery

See also

 National Register of Historic Places listings in Angelina County, Texas
 Recorded Texas Historic Landmarks in Angelina County
List of counties in Texas

References

External links
 Angelina County government
 
 Angelina County from the Texas Almanac
 Angelina County from the TXGenWeb Project

 
1846 establishments in Texas
Populated places established in 1846